Heinrich Schütz House may refer to,

 Heinrich Schütz House, Bad Köstritz
 Heinrich Schütz House, Weißenfels